Sarah Bouhaddi (born 17 October 1986) is a French professional footballer who plays as a goalkeeper for Division 1 Féminine club Paris Saint-Germain.

Club career
After spending 13 seasons with Lyon, Bouhaddi joined Paris Saint-Germain on 16 September 2022 on a one-year deal.

International career
Born in France, Bouhaddi is of Algerian descent. She made her debut for the France national team in 2004. She represented her nation at the 2012 Summer Olympics, playing in all of France's matches, as they reached fourth place. Bouhaddi went on to become her country's all-time most capped goalkeeper. In 2020, she paused her international career.

Career statistics

Club

International

Honours

Lyon
Division 1 Féminine (11): 2009–10, 2010–11, 2011–12, 2012–13, 2013–14, 2014–15, 2015–16, 2016–17, 2017–18, 2018–19, 2019–20
Coupe de France Féminine (8): 2011–12, 2012–13, 2013–14, 2014–15, 2015–16, 2016–17, 2018–19, 2019–20
UEFA Women's Champions League (8): 2010–11, 2011–12, 2015–16, 2016–17, 2017–18, 2018–19, 2019–20, 2021–22

France
Cyprus Cup: 2012, 2014
SheBelieves Cup:  2017

Individual
IFFHS World's Best Woman Goalkeeper: 2016, 2017, 2018
IFFHS Women's World Team: 2017, 2018, 2020
 UEFA Champions League Goalkeeper of the Season: 2019–20
The Best FIFA Goalkeeper: 2020

See also
 List of women's footballers with 100 or more international caps

References

External links

 
 
 France player profile 
 Player stats at footofeminin.fr 

1986 births
Living people
Sportspeople from Cannes
Footballers from Provence-Alpes-Côte d'Azur
Women's association football goalkeepers
French women's footballers
France women's youth international footballers
France women's international footballers
French sportspeople of Algerian descent
CNFE Clairefontaine players
Toulouse FC (women) players
Paris FC (women) players
Olympique Lyonnais Féminin players
OL Reign players
Paris Saint-Germain Féminine players
Division 1 Féminine players
National Women's Soccer League players
Olympic footballers of France
Footballers at the 2012 Summer Olympics
2015 FIFA Women's World Cup players
Footballers at the 2016 Summer Olympics
2019 FIFA Women's World Cup players
FIFA Century Club
French expatriate women's footballers
French expatriate sportspeople in the United States
Expatriate women's soccer players in the United States
UEFA Women's Euro 2017 players